Reform of the United Nations Security Council (UNSC) encompasses five key issues: categories of membership, the question of the veto held by the five permanent members, regional representation, the size of an enlarged Council and its working methods, and the Security Council-General Assembly relationship. The Member States, regional groups and other Member State interest groupings developed different positions and proposals on how to move forward on this contested issue.

Any reform of the Security Council would require the agreement of at least two-thirds of UN member states in a vote in the General Assembly and must be ratified by two-thirds of Member States. All of the permanent members of the UNSC (which have veto rights) must also agree.

History
The composition of the Security Council was established in 1945. Since then the geopolitical realities have changed drastically, but the council has changed very little. The victors of World War II shaped the United Nations Charter in their national interests, assigning themselves the permanent seats and associated veto power, among themselves. Any reform of the Security Council would require an amendment to the Charter. Article 108 of the Charter states:

With the enlargement of the United Nations membership and increasing self-confidence among the new members, going hand in hand with processes of decolonization, old structures and procedures were increasingly challenged. The imbalance between the number of seats in the Security Council and the total number of member States became evident, and the only significant reform of the Security Council occurred in 1965: this included an increase in the non-permanent membership from six to 10 members. With Boutros Boutros-Ghali elected as Secretary-General in 1992, the reform discussions of the UN Security Council were launched again as he started his new term with the first-ever summit of the Security Council and then published "An Agenda for Peace". His motivation was to restructure the composition and arguably anachronistic procedures of the UN organ to recognize the changed world. In the twenty-first century, the mismatch between the structure of the UN Security Council and the global reality the former is supposed to reflect became even more glaring. So much so that demands were raised by many politicians, diplomats and scholars to reform the Council at the earliest so that it reflects the reality of the present times and not the time of its establishment. For example, Indian scholar of diplomacy Rejaul Karim Laskar argues, "for the continued existence and relevance of the UN, it is necessary to ensure that it represents as nearly as possible the reality of the power equation of the twenty-first century world".

By 1992, Japan and Germany had become the second- and third-largest financial contributors to the United Nations, and started to demand a permanent seat. Also Brazil (fifth largest country in terms of territory) and India (second largest country in terms of population) as the most powerful countries within their regional groups and key players within their regions saw themselves with a permanent seat. This group of four countries formed an interest group later known as the G4.

On the other hand, their regional rivals were opposed to the G4 becoming permanent members with a veto power. They favored the expansion of the non-permanent category of seats with members to be elected on a regional basis. Italy, Pakistan, Mexico and Egypt started to form an interest group, known as the "Coffee Club" and later "Uniting for Consensus".

Simultaneously, the African Group started to demand two permanent seats for themselves, on the basis of historical injustices and because much of the council's agenda is concentrated in that continent. Those two seats would be permanent African seats, that would rotate between African countries chosen by the African group.

The existing permanent members, each holding the right of veto on Security Council reform, announced their positions reluctantly. The United States supported the permanent membership of Japan and India, and a small number of additional non-permanent members. The United Kingdom and France essentially supported the G4 position, with the expansion of permanent and non-permanent members and the accession of Germany, Brazil, India, and Japan to permanent-member status, as well as more African countries on the council. China supported the stronger representation of developing countries, voicing support for India. Russia has also endorsed India's candidature for a permanent seat on the Security Council.

General Assembly Task Force
The General Assembly Task Force on Security Council Reform has delivered a report (on the question of equitable representation on and increase in the membership of the Security Council) recommending a compromise solution for entering intergovernmental negotiations on reform.

The report builds on existing transitional/intermediary approaches to suggest a "timeline perspective". The "timeline perspective" suggests that Member States begin by identifying the negotiables to be included in short-term intergovernmental negotiations. Crucial to the "timeline perspective" is the scheduling of a mandatory review conference—a forum for discussing changes to any reforms achieved in the near-term, and for revisiting negotiables that cannot be agreed upon now.

Increasing membership

2005 Annan plan
On 21 March 2005, the then UN Secretary General Kofi Annan called on the UN to reach a consensus on expanding the council to 24 members, in a plan referred to as "InLarger Freedom". He gave two alternatives for implementation, but did not specify which proposal he preferred.

The two options mentioned by Annan are referred to as Plan A and Plan B:
 Plan A calls for creating six new permanent members, plus three new nonpermanent members for a total of 24 seats in the council.
 Plan B calls for creating eight new seats in a new class of members, who would serve for four years, subject to renewal, plus one nonpermanent seat, also for a total of 24.
In any case, Annan favored making the decision quickly, stating, "This important issue has been discussed for too long. I believe member states should agree to take a decision on it—preferably by consensus, but in any case before the summit—making use of one or other of the options presented in the report of the High-Level Panel".

The summit mentioned by Annan is the September 2005 Millennium+5 Summit, a high-level plenary meeting that reviewed Annan's report, the implementation of the 2000 Millennium Declaration, and other UN reform-related issues.

Uniting for Consensus

On 26 July 2005, five UN member countries, Italy, Argentina, Canada, Colombia and Pakistan, representing a larger group of countries called Uniting for Consensus led by Italy, proposed to the General Assembly another project that maintains five permanent members and raises the number of non-permanent members to 20.

In May 2011, 120 UN members states participated in a Uniting for Consensus meeting in Rome.

Permanent member proposals

One proposed change is to admit more permanent members. The candidates usually mentioned are Brazil, Germany, India, and Japan. They comprise the group of G4 nations, mutually supporting one another's bids for permanent seats. The United Kingdom, France, Russia and the United States support G4 membership in the U.N. Security Council. This sort of reform has traditionally been opposed by the Uniting for Consensus group, which is composed primarily of nations who are regional rivals and economic competitors of the G4. The group is led by Pakistan (opposing India), Italy and Spain (opposing Germany), Mexico, Colombia, and Argentina (opposing Brazil), and South Korea (opposing Japan), in addition to Turkey, Indonesia, and others. Since 1992, Italy and other members of the group have instead proposed semi-permanent seats or the expansion of the number of temporary seats.

Most of the leading candidates for permanent membership are regularly elected onto the Security Council by their respective continental groups: Brazil and Japan were elected for eleven two-year terms, India for eight terms, and Germany for four terms (as well as West Germany two times, and East Germany once). Brazil has the most recent successful bid being elected to the term 2022–2023, after a gap of eleven years.

In 2017, it was reported that the G4 nations were willing to temporarily forgo veto power if granted a permanent UNSC seat. As of 2013, the current P5 members of the Security Council, along with the G4, account for eight of the world's ten largest defense budgets, according to SIPRI. They also account for 9 of the 10 largest economies by both nominal GDP and Purchasing Power Parity.

Brazil

Brazil is the largest country in Latin America in terms of population, GDP and land area. It has the seventh largest population, ninth largest GDP, eleventh largest defence budget, and has the fifth largest land area in the world. It is one of only five countries that ranks among the top ten globally in terms of physical size, population, and GDP (the others being fellow G4 member India, together with China, Russia and the United States). Furthermore, South America is one of three inhabited continents (the other two being Africa and Oceania) without permanent representation on the Security Council.

Brazil has been elected eleven times to the Security Council. It has contributed troops to UN peacekeeping efforts in the Middle East, the former Belgian Congo, Cyprus, Mozambique, Angola, and more recently East Timor and Haiti. Brazil is one of the main contributors to the UN regular budget.

Prior to the UN's founding in 1945, Franklin D. Roosevelt lobbied for Brazil to be included on the Security Council, but the UK and the Soviet Union refused. The United States has sent strong indications to Brazil that it was willing to support its membership; albeit, without a veto. In June 2011, the Council on Foreign Relations recommended that the U.S. government fully endorse the inclusion of Brazil as a permanent member of the Security Council.

Brazil has received backing from four of the current permanent members, namely France, Russia, United Kingdom and China. Brazilian elevation to permanent membership is also supported by the Community of Portuguese Language Countries (CPLP), and Brazil and the other G4 nations mutually support each other in their bids. Other countries that advocate permanent Brazilian membership of the UNSC include Australia, Chile, Finland, Guatemala, Indonesia, the Philippines, Slovenia, South Africa, and Vietnam.

Germany

Germany is the third largest contributor to the U.N. regular budgets next to Japan, and as such, argues for a permanent Security Council seat. Germany has been elected to the Security Council as a non-permanent member four times as a unified state, as well as three times when it was divided (twice for the West, once for the East).

France has explicitly called for a permanent seat in the UN for its close partner: "Germany's engagement, its ranking as a great power, its international influence—France would like to see them recognized with a permanent seat on the Security Council", French president Jacques Chirac said in a speech in Berlin in 2000. The former German Chancellor, Gerhard Schröder, also identified Russia, among other countries, as a country that backed Germany's bid. Former President Fidel V. Ramos of the Philippines also expressed his country's support for Germany's bid, together with Japan's. Italy and the Netherlands on the contrary, suggest a common European Union seat in the Council instead of Germany becoming the third European member next to France and the United Kingdom. The former German Foreign Minister Joschka Fischer said that Germany would also accept a common European seat, but as long as there is little sign that France will give up her own seat, Germany should also have a seat.

The German campaign for a permanent seat was intensified in 2004. Schröder made himself perfectly clear in August 2004: "Germany has the right to a seat." Its bid is supported by Japan, India, Brazil, France, the United Kingdom and Russia, among other countries. Chancellor Angela Merkel, who had initially been quiet on the issue, re-stated Germany's bid in her address to the UN General Assembly in September 2007. In July 2011, Merkel's trip to Kenya, Angola, and Nigeria was thought to be motivated, in part, by the goal of seeking support from African countries for Germany's bid for a permanent seat on the Security Council.

On 30 June 2021, UK Foreign Minister Dominic Raab and his German counterpart Heiko Maas called in a joint statement for Germany to permanently join the United Nations Security Council, after outgoing German UN ambassador Christoph Heusgen said earlier in the day that needed to happen in order to reflect the shifting global power balance.

India

India, which joined the U.N. in 1945 (during the British Raj), two years before independence in 1947, is the second-largest and one of the largest constant contributors of troops to the United Nations peacekeeping missions. Foreign Policy magazine states that, "India's international identity has long been shaped by its role in U.N. peacekeeping, with more than 100,000 Indian troops having served in U.N. missions during the past 50 years. Today, India has over 8,500 peacekeepers in the field, more than twice as many as the U.N.'s five big powers combined." In November 2010, then US President Barack Obama publicly supported India's bid for a permanent seat, citing India's "long history as a leading contributor to United Nations peacekeeping missions". India has been elected eight times to the UN Security Council, most recently from 2021 to 2022 after receiving 184 of 192 votes.

The country currently has the world's second-largest population and is the world's largest liberal democracy. It is also the world's fifth-largest economy by nominal GDP and third-largest by purchasing power parity. Currently, India maintains the world's second-largest active armed force (after China) and is a nuclear-weapon state. The International Herald Tribune has stated: "Clearly, a seat for India would make the body more representative and democratic. With India as a member, the Council would be a more legitimate and thus a more effective body." 

India's bid for permanent member of UNSC is now backed by four of the five permanent members, namely France, Russia, United Kingdom and United States. On 15 April 2011, China officially expressed its support for an increased Indian role at the United Nations, without explicitly endorsing India's Security Council ambitions. A few months later, China endorsed Indian candidacy as a permanent UNSC member provided that India revokes its support for Japanese candidacy, given that Japan has a strained relationship with China.

As part of the G4 nations, India is supported by Brazil, Germany, and Japan for the permanent seat. Other countries that explicitly and openly support India for UNSC permanent seat are – Afghanistan, Algeria, Armenia, Australia, Austria, Bahrain, Bangladesh, Belarus, Belgium, Belize, Benin, Barbados, Bhutan, Bolivia, Brunei, Bulgaria, Burundi, Cambodia, Chile, Comoros, Croatia, Cuba, Cyprus, Czech Republic, Denmark, Dominican Republic, Ecuador, Eritrea, Estonia, Ethiopia, Fiji, Finland, Ghana, Greece, Guyana, Hungary, Iceland, Iran, Israel, Jamaica, Jordan, Laos, Latvia, Lesotho, Liberia, Libya, Lithuania, Luxembourg, Kazakhstan, Kiribati, Kyrgyzstan, Madagascar, Malawi, Malaysia, Maldives, Mali, Malta, Marshall Islands, Mauritius, Micronesia, Moldova, Mongolia, Morocco, Mozambique, Myanmar, Namibia, Nauru, Nepal, Netherlands, New Zealand, Nicaragua, Nigeria, Norway, Oman, Palau, Palestine, Panama, Papua New Guinea, Paraguay, Peru, Poland, Portugal, Qatar, Rwanda,  Romania, Samoa, São Tomé and Príncipe, Serbia, Senegal, Seychelles, Singapore, Sierra Leone, Sri Lanka, Slovakia, Slovenia, Solomon Islands, Sudan, Suriname, Swaziland, Sweden, Syria, Tajikistan, Tanzania, Thailand, The Bahamas, The Gambia, Timor Leste, Tonga, Trinidad and Tobago, Turkey, Turkmenistan, Tuvalu, Ukraine, United Arab Emirates, Uruguay, Uzbekistan, Vanuatu, Venezuela, Vietnam, Yemen, Zambia and Zimbabwe. As a whole, the African Union also supports India's candidacy for permanent member of the UNSC.

Japan

Japan, which joined the UN in 1956, is the third-largest contributor to the UN's regular budget. Its payments had surpassed the sum of those of the United Kingdom, France, China and Russia combined for nearly two decades before 2010. Japan has been one of the largest Official development assistance donor countries. Thus, Japan, along with India, are considered the most likely candidates for two of the new permanent seats. China has stated that it was ready to support India's move for a permanent seat on the UNSC if India did not associate its bid with Japan, which has a strained relationship with China. This may be contrary to the Indian stand since Japan and India are both members of the G4 and support each other's candidature. Japan has been elected to the Security Council for eleven terms as a non-permanent member.

While U.S. Secretary of State, Condoleezza Rice, speaking at Sophia University in Tokyo, said, "Japan has earned its honorable place among the nations of the world by its own effort and its own character. That's why the United States unambiguously supports a permanent seat for Japan on the United Nations Security Council." Her predecessor, Colin Powell, had objected to Japanese permanent membership because Article 9 of the Japanese Constitution forbids the country from going to war unless in self-defence. In May 2022, US president Joe Biden stated in a meeting with prime minister Fumio Kishida that “the United States will support Japan becoming a permanent member of a reformed security council”.

Some other Asian nations have expressed support for Japan's application, including Mongolia, Thailand, Cambodia, Indonesia, Malaysia, Singapore, Bangladesh, the Philippines, and Vietnam—all major recipients of loan and/or foreign investment from Japan. The other G4 countries—Germany, Brazil, and India, who are also bidding for Security Council seats—along with France and the United Kingdom, also back Japan's bid. Australia, the Cook Islands, the Federated States of Micronesia, Fiji, Kiribati, the Marshall Islands, Nauru, New Zealand, Niue, Palau, Papua New Guinea, Samoa, the Solomon Islands, Tonga, Tuvalu, and Vanuatu support Japan since Japan agreed to increase financial aid to the region. However, much opposition come from its East Asian neighbors such as South Korea and China due to Japan's reluctance to accept its militant past.

Veto reform

The UNSC "power of veto" is frequently cited as a major problem within the UN. By wielding their veto power (established by Chapter V of the United Nations Charter), any of the UNSC's five permanent members can prevent the adoption of any (non-"procedural") UNSC draft resolution not to their liking. Even the mere threat of a veto may lead to changes in the text of a resolution, or it being withheld altogether (the so-called "pocket veto"). As a result, the power of veto often prevents the council from acting to address pressing international issues and affords the "P5" great influence within the UN institution as a whole.

For example, the Security Council passed no resolutions on most major Cold War conflicts, including the Warsaw Pact invasion of Czechoslovakia, the Vietnam War, and the Soviet–Afghan War. Resolutions addressing more current problems, such as the conflict between Israel and Palestine or Iran's suspected development of nuclear weapons, are also heavily influenced by the veto, whether its actual use or the threat of its use. Additionally, the veto applies to the selection of the UN's Secretary-General, as well as any amendments to the UN Charter, giving the P5 great influence over these processes. China has exercised its veto several times on India's resolutions to put Masood Azhar on a list of global terrorists. Azhar is the head of Jaish-e-Mohammed, which has been designated as a terrorist group by the United Nations.

Discussions on improving the UN's effectiveness and responsiveness to international security threats often include reform of the UNSC veto. Proposals include: limiting the use of the veto to vital national security issues; requiring agreement from multiple states before exercising the veto; abolishing the veto entirely; and embarking on the transition stipulated in Article 106 of the Charter, which requires the consensus principle to stay in place. Any reform of the veto will be very difficult. Articles 108 and 109 of the United Nations Charter grant the P5 veto over any amendments to the Charter, requiring them to approve of any modifications to the UNSC veto power that they themselves hold.

In 2013, France proposed self-regulation by the five permanent members of the Security Council to refrain from using it against taking action to stop mass atrocities.

Overall positions on reforming the Security Council

Brazil
As stated by then President of Brazil Luiz Inácio Lula da Silva at the General Debate of the 63rd Session of the United Nations General Assembly:

As stated by the President of Brazil Jair Bolsonaro in a state visit to India:

India
As per the official website of India's Permanent Mission to the UN:

According to a formal statement by 13th Prime Minister of India Manmohan Singh at the General Debate of the 59th Session of the United Nations General Assembly:

According to a formal statement by 14th Prime Minister of India Narendra Modi at the General Debate of the 69th Session of the United Nations General Assembly:

As per the official letter send to president of UN general assembly 
by India's Permanent Mission to the UN:
It also included the common letter send by G4 nations which demands concrete action on UNSC reforms. The process has lagged on for over a decade.

According to a formal statement by Prime Minister of India Narendra Modi at the General Debate of the 75th Session of the United Nations General Assembly :

According to a formal statement by Foreign secretary of India Harsh Vardhan Shringla at UNSC high-level meeting on “Maintenance of international peace and security: upholding multilateralism and the United Nations-centered international system”:

Japan
According to a formal statement by Toshimitsu Motegi, Japanese Minister of Foreign Affairs, at the High-level Meeting to Commemorate the Seventy-fifth Anniversary of the United Nations:

Lithuania
According to a formal statement by Antanas Valionis, former Lithuanian Minister of Foreign Affairs, at the General Debate of the 58th session of the United Nations:

Malaysia
According to a formal statement by Prime Minister of Malaysia Mahathir Mohamad at the General Debate of the 73rd session of the United Nations General Assembly:

Portugal
As stated by former Prime Minister of Portugal José Sócrates:

Russia
As stated by then–President of Russia Dmitry Medvedev at the General Debate of the 64th Session of the United Nations General Assembly:

As stated by the Minister of Foreign Affairs Sergey Lavrov at the Raisina Dialogue in New Delhi:

As stated by the Minister of Foreign Affairs Sergey Lavrov after RIC virtual conference summit:

South Africa
According to a formal statement by South Africa's International Relations Minister Maite Nkoana-Mashabane speaking in the South African parliament in Cape Town:

Turkey

According to a formal statement by Turkey's President Recep Tayyip Erdoğan in a recorded message to congratulate the U.N. General Assembly (UNGA) on its 75th anniversary:

United Kingdom and France
The United Kingdom and France hold similar views on reform to the United Nations Security Council. According to a formal statement made by 10 Downing Street:

United States
According to a formal statement by the United States Department of State:

According to a formal statement by US President Barack Obama in an address to a Joint Session of the Indian Parliament:
In 2022, Linda Thomas-Greenfield, ambassador to the UN, pledged that the United States would push to reform the UNSC so that it would "better reflect the current global realities and incorporate more geographically diverse perspectives."

References

Further reading
 
 Bardo Fassbender, UN Security Council Reform and the Right of Veto: A Constitutional Perspective, Kluwer Law International, The Hague / London / Boston, 1998. .
 Bardo Fassbender, 'Pressure for Security Council Reform', in: David M. Malone (ed.), The UN Security Council: From the Cold War to the 21st Century, Lynne Rienner Publishers, Boulder, Colorado, and London, 2004, pp. 341–355.
 Bardo Fassbender, 'The Security Council: Progress is Possible but Unlikely', in: Antonio Cassese (ed.), Realizing Utopia: The Future of International Law, Oxford University Press, 2012, pp. 52–60.
 
 Hans Köchler, The Voting Procedure in the United Nations Security Council, 1991, 
 Hans Köchler, The United Nations and International Democracy. The Quest for UN Reform, 1997, 
 
 McDonald, Kara C.; Patrick, Stewart M.: UN Security Council Enlargement and U.S. Interests, Council on Foreign Relations, 2010.
 Malone, D & Mahbubani, K: "The UN Security Council – from the Cold War to the 21st Century", UN World Chronicle, 30 March 2004.
 
Runjic, Ljubo, Reform of the United Nations Security Council: The Emperor Has No Clothes, Brazilian Journal of International Law, v. 14, n. 2, 2017.

External links
 The different projects of reform (G4, Africa Union, United for consensus; 2006) 
 Center for UN Reform—Independent policy research organization offering documentation and in-depth analysis on ongoing reform processes

United Nations reform
United N
China and the United Nations
France and the United Nations
Germany and the United Nations
India and the United Nations
United N
Russia and the United Nations
United Kingdom and the United Nations
United States and the United Nations